Talk About You may refer to:

 "Talk About You", a 2008 song by The Maybes?
 "Talk About You", a 2015 song by Mika

See also
 I Wanna Talk About You, Tete Montoliu
 I Want to Talk About You, David Murray